
Year 1488 (MCDLXXXVIII) was a leap year starting on Tuesday of the Julian calendar.

Events

January–December 
 January 8 – The Royal Netherlands Navy is formed, by the decree of Maximillian of Austria.
 February 3 – Bartolomeu Dias of Portugal lands in Mossel Bay, after rounding the Cape of Good Hope at the tip of Africa, becoming the first known European to travel this far south, and entering the Indian Ocean. 
 February 28 – Choe Bu (1454–1504), the Korean Commissioner of Registers for the island of Cheju, shipwrecks on the south east coast of China in Taizhou, Zhejiang.
 June 11 – Battle of Sauchieburn: James IV of Scotland becomes king after his father is killed in action.
 July 12 – Joseon Dynasty official Choe Bu returned to Korea after months of shipwrecked travel in China.
 July 28 – Battle of Saint-Aubin-du-Cormier: Troops loyal to King Charles VIII of France defeat rebel forces, led by the Dukes of Orleans and Brittany, in the main engagement of the Mad War.
 September 9 – Anne of Brittany becomes Duchess of Brittany at the age of 11. Her marriage to King Charles VIII in 1491 effectively ends Breton independence from France.

Date unknown 
 Jasper Tudor, 1st Duke of Bedford, takes possession of Cardiff Castle.
 Michelangelo Buonarroti becomes apprentice to Domenico Ghirlandaio.
 The city of Bikaner in western India is founded by Rao Bika.
 Rathbornes Candles is established in Dublin; the company is still trading in the 21st century.

Births 
 January 6 – Helius Eobanus Hessus, German Latin poet (d. 1540)
 January 20
 John George, Marquis of Montferrat, Italian noble (d. 1533)
 Sebastian Münster, German scholar, cartographer, and cosmographer (d. 1552)
 March 19 – Johannes Magnus, last Catholic Archbishop of Sweden (d. 1544)
 April 16 – Jungjong of Joseon (d. 1544)
 April 21 – Ulrich von Hutten, German religious reformer (d. 1523)
 May 1 – Sidonie of Bavaria, eldest daughter of Duke Albrecht IV of Bavaria-Munich (d. 1505)
 May 5 – Lê Uy Mục, 8th king of the later Lê dynasty of Vietnam (d. 1509)
 May 7 – John III of the Palatinate, Administrator of the Bishopric of Regensburg (d. 1538)
 June – Heinrich Glarean, Swiss music theorist (d. 1563)
 June 29 – Pedro Pacheco de Villena, Spanish Catholic cardinal (d. 1560)
 July 15 – Juan Álvarez de Toledo, Spanish Catholic cardinal (d. 1557)
 October 17 – Ursula of Brandenburg, Duchess consort of Mecklenburg-Schwerin (d. 1510)
 December 15 – Ferdinand, Duke of Calabria (d. 1550)
 date unknown
 Rabbi Yosef Karo, Spanish Jewish scholar (d. 1575)
 Oswald Myconius, Swiss religious reformer (d. 1552)
 Jan Tarnowski, Polish nobleman (d. 1561)
 Thomas of Villanova, Spanish bishop (d. 1555)
 Gustav Trolle, Archbishop of Uppsala (d. 1533)
 Elisabeth of Nassau-Siegen, German noblewoman (d. 1559)
 probable
 Thomas Audley, 1st Baron Audley of Walden, Lord Chancellor of England (d. 1544)
 Guillaume Gouffier, seigneur de Bonnivet, French soldier (d. 1525)
 Myles Coverdale, English Bible translator (d. 1568)
 Lütfi Pasha, Ottoman statesman (d. 1564)

Deaths 
 April 1 – John II, Duke of Bourbon (b. 1426)
 April 14 – Girolamo Riario, Lord of Imola and Forli (b. 1443)
 May 9 – Frederick I of Liegnitz, Duke of Chojnów and Strzelin from 1453 (b. 1446)
 May 26 – Iizasa Ienao, Japanese swordsman (b. c. 1387)
 June 11 – King James III of Scotland (at the Battle of Sauchieburn; b. c. 1451)
 July 18 – Alvise Cadamosto, Italian explorer (b. 1432)
 July 28 – Edward Woodville, Lord Scales (at the Battle of St. Aubin-du-Cormier; b. c. 1456)
 July 30 – Clarice Orsini, Florentine noblewoman and wife of Lorenzo de’ Medici (b. 1453)
September – Abu 'Amr 'Uthman,  Hafsid caliph of Ifriqiya (b. 1419)
 September 9 – Francis II, Duke of Brittany (fell from a horse) (b. 1433)
 September 13 – Charles II, Duke of Bourbon (b. 1434)
October 11 – Geoffroy Cœur, French nobleman, son of Jacques Cœur
 date unknown
 Mary Stewart, Countess of Arran (b. 1453)
 Andrea del Verrocchio, Italian sculptor (b. c. 1435)
 Borommatrailokkanat, Ayutthaya king (b. 1431)

References